Louisiana's 11th State Senate district is one of 39 districts in the Louisiana State Senate. It has been represented by Republican Patrick McMath since 2020.

Geography
District 11 covers northern parts of Greater New Orleans in St. Tammany and Tangipahoa Parishes along Lake Pontchartrain, including some or all of Lacombe, Mandeville, Covington, Abita Springs, and Hammond.

The district overlaps with Louisiana's 1st and 5th congressional districts, and with the 73rd, 74th, 77th, 86th, 89th, and 104th districts of the Louisiana House of Representatives.

Recent election results
Louisiana uses a jungle primary system. If no candidate receives 50% in the first round of voting, when all candidates appear on the same ballot regardless of party, the top-two finishers advance to a runoff election.

2019

2015

2011

Federal and statewide results in District 11

References

Louisiana State Senate districts
St. Tammany Parish, Louisiana
Tangipahoa Parish, Louisiana